The following radio stations broadcast on AM frequency 1233 kHz:

Australia
2NC at Newcastle, New South Wales

Italy
Milano XR at Milano

Japan
JOGR at Aomori
JOUR at Nagasaki
JOVL at Tanabeshirahama
NHK Radio 1 from Osaka (Shin'onsen relay)

Korea, People’s Republic
KBS Radio 1 at Yeongyang (HLSQ) & Pyongchang

New Zealand
Today FM at Wellington

Philippines
DWRV-AM at Nueva Vizcaya and Quirino
DYVS at Bacolod
DZAU at Camarines Norte

Thailand
Thor. Or. 01

References

Lists of radio stations by frequency